Qurban Ali Khan was a former governor  of the Khyber-Pakhtunkhwa of Pakistan. He remained chief commissioner of Balochistan from 13 February 1953 to 8 November 1954.

References

Governors of Khyber Pakhtunkhwa